
Xinqiao may refer to a number of locations in China:

Transport
 Hefei Xinqiao International Airport, the main airport in Hefei, Anhui Province, China
 Xinqiao railway station, on the Shanghai–Kunming Railway in Songjiang District, Shanghai, China
 Xinqiao station (Chongqing Rail Transit), a metro station on Line 9 (Chongqing Rail Transit)
 Xinqiao station (Wenzhou Rail Transit), a metro station on Line S1 (Wenzhou Rail Transit)

Towns
 Xinqiao, Changting County, Fujian
 Xinqiao, Zhangping, Fujian
 Xinqiao, Guangdong, in Gaoyao
 Xinqiao, Binyang County, in Binyang County, Guangxi
 Xinqiao, Yulin, Guangxi, in Yuzhou District, Yulin, Guangxi
 Xinqiao, Guizhou, in Anlong County
 Xinqiao, Xiangcheng City, Henan
 Xinqiao, Hengshan, a town of Hengshan County, Hunan.
 Xinqiao, Hengyang, in Hengshan County, Hunan
 Xinqiao, Zhangjiajie, in Yongding District, Zhangjiajie, Hunan
 Xinqiao, Changzhou, in Xinbei District, Changzhou, Jiangsu
 Xinqiao, Zhenjiang, in Danyang, Jiangsu
 Xinqiao, Jiangyin, Jiangsu
 Xinqiao, Jingjiang, Jiangsu
 Xinqiao, Shanghai, in Songjiang District, Shanghai
 Xinqiao, Mianyang, in Youxian District, Mianyang, Sichuan
 Xinqiao, Zigong, in Rong County, Sichuan
 Xinqiao, Suining, in Chuanshan District, Suining, Sichuan
 Xinqiao, Zizhong County, Sichuan
 Xinqiao, Yunnan, in Mouding County
 Xinqiao, Taizhou, Zhejiang, in Luqiao District
 Xinqiao, Ningbo, in Xiangshan County, Zhejiang
 Xinqiao, Zhangjiajie, a town of Yongding District in Zhangjiajie, Hunan

Townships
 Xinqiao Township, Fujian, in Taining County
 Xinqiao Township, Henan, in Yongcheng
 Xinqiao Township, Guang'an, in Guang'an District, Guang'an, Sichuan
 Xinqiao Township, Xiaojin County, Sichuan
 Xinqiao Township, Zhejiang, in Changshan County

Subdistricts
 Xinqiao Subdistrict, Chongqing, in Shapingba District
 Xinqiao Subdistrict, Zhangzhou, in Xiangcheng District, Zhangzhou, Fujian
 Xinqiao Subdistrict, Wenzhou, in Ouhai District, Wenzhou, Zhejiang

Village
 Xinqiao, Huilong, a village in Huilong, Hanchuan, Xiaogan, Hubei